Padavayal is a village in the Palakkad district, state of Kerala, India. It is administrated by the Pudur Grama Panchayat.

Demographics
As of 2011 India census, Padavayal village had total population of 6,144 where 3,053 are males and 3,091 are females. Total number of households is 1,719. Population of children in the age group of 0-6 is 881 (14.3%) which consists of 438 boys and 443 girls. Literacy rate of Padavayal village was 58.9% lower than state average of 94%. Male literate population was 1,752 (67%) and female literates were 1,347 (50.9%).

References

Villages in Palakkad district